Henry Brooke, Baron Brooke of Cumnor,  (9 April 1903 – 29 March 1984) was a British Conservative Party politician who served as Chief Secretary to the Treasury and Paymaster-General from 1961 to 1962 and — following the "Night of the Long Knives" — as Home Secretary from 1962 to 1964.

Early life and education
Brooke was born in Oxford, the son of artist Leonard Leslie Brooke and Sybil Diana Brooke, daughter of Irish Chaplain Stopford Augustus Brooke. He was educated at Marlborough College, where he was a classmate of Rab Butler, and Balliol College, Oxford. He had an elder brother, 2nd Lt. Leonard Stopford Brooke, who was killed in Germany in 1918 while serving with the Army Cyclist Corps.

Political career
After teaching philosophy at Balliol College for a year, Brooke worked at a Quaker settlement for the unemployed in the Rhondda Valley from 1927 to 1928. This experience led him to turn down the offer of a Fellowship in philosophy at Balliol in favour of a lifetime in politics. After a year on The Economist, Brooke became one of the original members, and subsequently Deputy Chairman, of the Conservative Research Department (1929–1937) under the chairmanship of Neville Chamberlain. The impetus for the pre-war "special areas" legislation was derived from his unsigned articles on "Places without a Future" which he wrote for The Times in 1934.

He was elected as a Conservative Member of Parliament (MP) for Lewisham West in a 1938 by-election. He spoke at the request of the Whips in support of Chamberlain in the debate of May 1940, just before the prime minister's fall from power, and Brooke himself was defeated in the 1945 general election. The next year he was elected to the London County Council, and served as Conservative leader on the council until 1951, continuing to serve on the Council and the Hampstead borough council until 1955. In 1949, he led the Conservative party on the London County Council to the brink of seizing power for only the third time in its history. From 1946 to 1948 he was the last deputy chairman of the Southern Railway before nationalisation.

Brooke returned to parliament in 1950 as MP for Hampstead, and entered Winston Churchill's government in 1954 as Financial Secretary to the Treasury, serving under Rab Butler and Harold Macmillan when they were Chancellors of the Exchequer. He continued in this job until 1957, when he became Minister of Housing and Local Government and Minister of Welsh Affairs in the Macmillan government, entering the Cabinet. In the former job he was the main driving force behind making London a smokeless zone. He attracted controversy when steering the Rent Bill through Parliament after it had already secured a Second Reading in the House of Commons under his predecessors. In the latter job, he caused anger throughout Wales through his crucial support of Liverpool Council's bid to secure Westminster's approval of an Act of Parliament to flood Cwm Tryweryn in Meirionydd, thereby by-passing Welsh local authority opposition to the scheme. However, largely in response to the protests over Tryweryn, he subsequently attracted investment to Wales, including such projects as the Severn Bridge, the steelworks at Llanwern, and the Heads of the Valleys Road. In 1961 he became the first Chief Secretary to the Treasury in modern times.

In 1962, he reached his highest level in government, becoming Home Secretary following Harold Macmillan's "Night of the Long Knives" when many senior ministers were sacked. As Home Secretary, Brooke was not particularly successful, and his actions caused controversy on several occasions, including his response to the noisy demonstrations against the state visit by King Paul and Queen Frederica of Greece.

In his obituary in The Times, the author wrote: "His tenure of this difficult post was not a particularly happy one, and although his integrity and fairness were generally admired, there was a feeling in some quarters that he lacked the sensitiveness and flexibility required in the handling of difficult individual cases." In the Dictionary of National Biography, Lord Blake wrote that Brooke had to take a number of decisions in the field of immigration and deportation which infuriated libertarians, and that he seemed to display a certain insensitivity in these cases – an impression enhanced by his somewhat pedantic way of speech. In the Oxford Dictionary of National Biography Philip Knightley-Smith wrote, of his two years at the Home Office: "His declared priorities were to confront the crime wave and to reduce prison over-crowding by a new building programme: but his deliberative pragmatism was ill-suited to his new responsibilities. Brooke's 27 months as home secretary proved peculiarly unsuccessful."

He was plunged into controversy at the very beginning of his term of office because of his initial reaction to the case of Carmen Bryan. Bryan was a 22-year-old Jamaican woman and first offender, who pleaded guilty to petty larceny (shoplifting goods worth £2) and was recommended for deportation by Paddington magistrates. Brooke's acquiescence to the court order and her six-week detention in Holloway Prison pending deportation was seen as both unnecessary and unjust. Neither bail nor the opportunity for her to appeal were offered directly to her. Standing firm, Brooke told the House of Commons, "I think it would be a great act of injustice if I were to stand in the way of her returning to Jamaica. I am not prepared to look at this case again". However, criticism in Parliament and in the media combined to force a speedy review where, four days later, Brooke recanted, freeing Bryan and allowing her to remain. Deportations for misdemeanours were subsequently suspended. There had been more than eighty recommendations for deportation in the seven weeks following the Conservative Government's introduction of the Commonwealth Immigrants Act (1962).

Brooke was one of many politicians to receive unprecedented criticism on That Was The Week That Was on BBC Television in 1962–63, which called him "the most hated man in Britain" and ended a mock profile of him with the phrase "If you're Home Secretary, you can get away with murder". He was also involved in the passage of various new anti-drug laws, including ones banning possession of amphetamines and the growing of cannabis. As the final arbiter in death penalty cases he was the last Home Secretary to allow death sentences to go ahead for the murder of John Alan West.

Sir Alec Douglas-Home kept Brooke in office as Home Secretary when he became Prime Minister in October 1963, and his last 12 months in office, which saw the introduction of the Police Act 1964 and the creation of a Royal Commission on Crime and Punishment, attracted much less controversy.

Brooke went into opposition following the Conservative defeat in 1964, and he lost his seat in the subsequent election in 1966. Having been appointed to the Order of the Companions of Honour (CH) in 1964, he was created a life peer as Baron Brooke of Cumnor, of Cumnor in the Royal County of Berkshire on 20 July 1966, and acted as a Conservative front bench spokesman in the House of Lords until 1970. The onset of Parkinson's disease then led him to retire gradually from public life.

Personal life and family

Brooke married Barbara Muriel, daughter of the Reverend Alfred Mathews, in 1933. As she was made a life peer, too, they were one of the few couples who both held titles in their own right. The couple had four children:

Peter Leonard Brooke (b. 1934), later The Lord Brooke of Sutton Mandeville, a Conservative politician.
Sir Henry Brooke (1936–2018), a judge and Lord Justice of Appeal.
Honor Leslie Brooke (b. 1941), married Thomas Nigel Miller.
Margaret Hilary Diana Brooke (b. 1944), married James Pulfer.

Lord Brooke of Cumnor died from Parkinson's disease in March 1984, aged 80. One biographer has written of him: "He was a quiet, friendly, honest and steadfast man, who was regarded by his detractors as a cruel, deceitful, ogre. His gentle, affectionate memoir of his father Leslie Brooke and Johnny Crow (1982) belies the public's view of him".  His wife died in September 2000, aged 92.

Notes

References
 
 

1903 births
1984 deaths
People educated at Marlborough College
Alumni of Balliol College, Oxford
Conservative Party (UK) MPs for English constituencies
Brooke of Cumnor
Members of London County Council
Members of Hampstead Metropolitan Borough Council
Secretaries of State for the Home Department
Spouses of life peers
Members of the Order of the Companions of Honour
Members of the Privy Council of the United Kingdom
UK MPs 1935–1945
UK MPs 1950–1951
UK MPs 1951–1955
UK MPs 1955–1959
UK MPs 1959–1964
UK MPs 1964–1966
UK MPs who were granted peerages
Life peers created by Elizabeth II
United Kingdom Paymasters General
Neurological disease deaths in England
Deaths from Parkinson's disease
Ministers in the third Churchill government, 1951–1955
Ministers in the Eden government, 1955–1957
Ministers in the Macmillan and Douglas-Home governments, 1957–1964
Chief Secretaries to the Treasury